Iduna may refer to:
 One of several modern anglicizations of the name of the Norse goddess Iðunn
 176 Iduna, an asteroid named after the goddess
 Iduna (bird), a genus of tree warblers
 Iduna (literature society)
 Iduna, Wisconsin, an unincorporated community, United States
 Iduna language, spoken in Papua New Guinea
 The journal of the Swedish Geatish Society
 Iduna, a character from Disney's animated films of Frozen

See also
 Izuna (disambiguation)